Tony Fennell (born 16 November 1963) is a British musician, songwriter and producer. He was the lead singer, lyricist and musician for the band Ultravox from 1992 until 1994, as well as a writer and producer of music for television.

Fennell has signed publishing and recording contracts with Warner Brothers, Atlantic, EMI and BMG. His film and television credits include Disney, Nickelodeon, Viacom, HBO, PBS and Syfy as well as commercials for Dodge, Mattel and General Mills.

Career 
Fennell was born in Birmingham, and started playing music in the early 1980s, signing his first publishing contract with Warner/Chappell Music. His band, Mr. President, went on to sign with Atlantic Records. During this time, Fennell was also the bass player for Edwin Starr. In 1985, the band changed its name to "Big Noise". The band released the album Bang! , produced by Elliot Wolfe (Paula Abdul). He toured extensively throughout the United Kingdom and Europe, including with James Brown.

After moving to the US permanently in the late 1980s, Fennell co-wrote with David Frank (The System) the track "If You Believe" for soul singer Kenny Thomas' 1991 Platinum album Voices.

In 1992 Fennell became the lead singer of UK band Ultravox and signed with EMI. He recorded the EP "Vienna 92" and co-wrote the album Revelation.

In 1995 Fennell signed a publishing deal with Japanese company Avex. While with Avex, Fennell co-wrote the underscore for the movie Within the Rock (Gary Tunnicliffe) for the Syfy Channel. Teaming up with Rod Gammons (Liberty X) and Bob Khozouri (Eternal), he co-wrote two songs for Jaki Graham's album Hold On and another for her album Real Life.

In 1996/7 Fennell formed the band Luxx with fellow Englishman Ian Hatton (Bonham, The Honeydrippers) and signed with Push/BMG. The band went on to record two albums: Luxx and Hyrdroponic and toured the US over a period of 4 years.

In the early 2000s, he wrote and recorded songs for Bear In The Big Blue House (Disney), Little Bill (CBS), Out Of The Box (Nickelodeon), Gullah Gullah Island (Nickelodeon), Cyberchase (PBS), Scrubs (ABC) and Nash Bridges (CBS).

In 2004, he signed with Zest Music as the in-house writer/ producer working in conjunction with CEO Steve Weltman (Chrysalis, Hit and Run Music). With Zest, Fenelle wrote and produced with Richard Evans (Peter Gabriel) and co-wrote and produced the album Night Racing for Tara Chinn. Fenelle and Chinn went on to tour Australia to promote the album Night Racing.

In 2009, Fennell wrote/ produced songs and underscore for the movie, King Of The Avenue (Ving Rhames).

In 2010, Fennell co-wrote "Crash and Burn" and "Black and White" with Alex Smith (James Morrison) and Karen Louise Barrowor Scarlette Fever. "Crash and Burn" achieved high rotation on BBC Radio 2's B-List and the Jason Nevins remix reached number 2 in the Music Week Commercial Pop Club Chart. It also made the top ten of the Billboard Breakout Club Charts in the USA.

In 2013/14 Fennell wrote and co-produced with Jason Silver (Mark Ronson) the album Bring It Back for singer Brenda Edwards (We Will Rock You/The X Factor). He is writing/producing with bass player Chip Z'nuff and the band Enuff Z'nuff and has produced two songs for the band's latest release "Diamond Boy".

In March 2019, following a three and a half year stint with the band, Fennell announced his departure from Enuff Z'nuff in a statement on the band's Facebook page.

June 2019 saw Fennell join as lead singer and guitar player for the band When in Rome II. During January–March 2020, he embarked on a nationwide US tour with the Motels and is recording new material for the band.

Current work 
Fennell is currently the co-founder and co-owner of the company Musations. The company released the social media/music app, Musations in July 2014. The app consequently charted at #3 in the Apple AppStore's free music downloads.

Partial Discography 
Big Noise - Bang  (1989)
Ultravox - "Vienna 92" (1992)
Ultravox - Revelation (1993)
Gerry Laffy - Sheer Greed
Luxx - Luxx
Luxx - Hydroponic
Bear in the Big Blue House
Scarlette Fever - Medication Time
Brenda Edwards - Bring It Back
Enuff Znuff - Diamond Boy (2018)

References

External links

http://www.imdb.com/title/tt0118183/fullcredits cast Within The Rock

1963 births
Living people
Musicians from Birmingham, West Midlands
English rock singers
English male singer-songwriters